The 2015–16 season was Colchester United's 79th season in their history and their eighth consecutive season in League One, the third tier of English football. Along with competing in League One, the club will also participate in the FA Cup, League Cup and Football League Trophy. The club suffered relegation to League Two, the fourth tier of English football, for the first time in 18-years after finishing the season in 23rd position and in the relegation zone. Colchester made an early exit in the League Cup at the hands of Reading, while they made the fourth round of the FA Cup for the first time in ten years but were defeated by Premier League side Tottenham Hotspur 4–1.

The season was notable for managerial changes. Tony Humes began the season in charge, but after a string of successive defeats, he left by mutual consent in November. Richard Hall and John McGreal took temporary charge for one match before they were replaced by Wayne Brown. Kevin Keen took up the reins in December but was unable to transform the U's fortunes, and they were relegated under his stewardship. He left with two games of the season after relegation was confirmed, and his assistant David Wright was placed in the caretaker position. McGreal was then named Keen's permanent successor ahead of the final game of the season, but would not take charge until the season had ended. This meant McGreal's new assistant manager, Steve Ball, managed the side for the last game of 2015–16.

Season overview

Preseason
Just two days after Colchester United had secured their League One status for another year, the club began making changes to its playing staff. Following his public disagreement with manager Tony Humes in February 2015 when substituted in the game against Doncaster Rovers, Sean Clohessy had his contract terminated just one year into his two-year deal, having made 37 appearances for the club and captained the side. Following him out the exit door was Dominic Smith, who made his one and only first-team appearance in Humes' first game in charge against Walsall in September 2014, following the expiry of his one-year deal.

Three players extended their contracts with Colchester on 8 May, with Jack Curtis, Byron Lawrence and Michael O'Donoghue all remaining with the club for a further year. After featuring for the club eight times during the 2014–15 season, recently released Rotherham United defender Richard Brindley held talks with Colchester with a view to joining the club on a permanent basis. It was then announced on 15 May that club captain Magnus Okuonghae would not be offered a new deal to remain with the club when his deal expired. Okuonghae, who had spent six years with the U's, played 215 games for the club, but a ruptured achilles tendon early in the previous campaign brought a premature end to his season. Tony Humes described Okuonghae as "an excellent servant to the club". Also leaving the Colchester Community Stadium was Colchester United influential sports scientist Dave Carolan, who headed to Birmingham City to take up a role as the head of sports science for the Championship club. Meanwhile, winger Dion Sembie-Ferris, who made his first-team debut against Cardiff City in the FA Cup third round last season, committed his future to the club by signing a new three-year deal.

Tony Humes continued his clear out of players in preparation for the new season. Leaving the club were winger Sanchez Watt, Jabo Ibehre and academy defender Kevin Lokko, who were all out of contract and out of favour under Humes. Colchester were also considering making offers to former loanees Elliott Hewitt and Matthew Briggs following their release from Ipswich Town and Millwall respectively, while they had also offered a new contract to David Fox following the expiry of his short-term deal with the club.

Richard Brindley became the first new signing of the summer on 2 June, joining from Rotherham after his release. He signed a two-year deal with the U's following his loan spell with the club at the end of the 2014–15 season. On 10 June, it was announced that former West Ham United youngster Kieran Bailey had signed a development contract with the club, after he had featured for John McGreal's under-21 squad during the closing stages of the 2014–15 season. Another former loanee signed up with the U's on a permanent basis on 22 June, with Matthew Briggs signing a two-year contract on a free transfer after the expiry of his contract with Millwall. Stand-in captain David Fox decided against signing a new contract with the U's in order to return to the North West of England where his family were situated in late June. Left-back Ben Gordon was allowed to leave the club on 1 July, having been displaced in the first-team by Matthew Briggs last season and his subsequent arrival on a permanent basis. He was one year into a two-year deal.

After rejecting a reduced-terms contract offer with Oldham Athletic, Colchester re-signed George Elokobi on a two-year contract on 3 July, having spent 2004 to 2008 with the U's. Colchester then announced the signing of former Yeovil Town midfielder and captain Joe Edwards on 6 July on a free transfer, joining on a one-year contract with an option of a further year.

After returning for pre-season training on 1 July, the players had their first friendly match at Scraley Road on 11 July against Heybridge Swifts. Humes fielded two different teams in either half, both scoring four and not conceding to hand the U's a comfortable 8–0 win. Chris Porter, who captained the side during the first-half, scored the opening goal after 24 minutes from a Richard Brindley cross. Brindley was again the provider for triallist Olly Lee to score the second soon after. Porter scored his second with a penalty after Dan Holman had been fouled in the area, before George Moncur rounded off the scoring for the first-half. Drey Wright scored from 30 yards to bring the score to 5–0 early in the second-half, with Macauley Bonne then finding the back of the net, and Sammie Szmodics lifting the ball over the onrushing Heybridge goalkeeper. Wright scored his second late on to seal the victory. Colchester played a similar format in their next friendly at Brentwood Town on 14 July, with the same team that played in the final 45 minutes of the win over Heybridge starting against Brentwood, with the only switch between Brindley and Tosin Olufemi. Gavin Massey scored the opening two goals, the first of which was a volley, and the second from a Szmodics pass. Szmodics then scored for himself, with Bonne registering his second of pre-season just one minute later. The U's went in at half-time 4–0 up, and the scores remained the same until the final whistle, with the entire team substituted at half-time for those that started against Heybridge.

After appearing in both of Colchester's pre-season friendlies, it was announced that second year scholar Cameron James had signed a four-year professional contract with the club. Joining the defender in signing was fellow scholar and forward Tariq Issa.

Colchester defeated Bishop's Stortford 3–2 on 18 July, coming from one goal down to win. After Sheldon Sellears opened the scoring for the home side, Colchester hit back through Jack Curtis after the interval. Dan Holman added the U's second, before Macauley Bonne scoring his third goal in three games to wrap up the win for the visitors. Kenzer Lee pulled a goal back for Stortford, but Colchester held on for the victory.

Chris Porter was announced as Colchester United's new club captain on 21 July, with Alex Gilbey his vice-captain. This news came ahead of Colchester's first home friendly of the season against West Ham. George Moncur converted a 13th minute free kick to hand the U's a 1–0 win over their Premier League counterparts. Goalkeeper Elliot Parish, who had appeared in all of Colchester's previous friendlies including a full 90 minutes against West Ham, signed a one-year contract with Colchester on 23 July to battle against both Chris Lewington and Sam Walker, who had missed all previous pre-season matches through injury. Development squad goalkeeper James Bransgrove had also been ruled out by injury until September.

The U's suffered their first defeat of pre-season on 25 July when they hosted Leyton Orient at the Community Stadium, losing 3–0 during a game which saw the return of Sam Walker from injury. In the penultimate friendly of pre-season, Colchester welcomed Ipswich to the Community Stadium for their now regular pre-season friendly. Town took the lead through Kévin Bru just before half-time, but Alex Gilbey equalised seven minutes after the restart with a well taken low shot. Ipswich again took the lead on 64 minutes with a penalty from David McGoldrick after Alex Wynter was judged to have handled the ball inside the box. However, Gilbey once again equalised for the U's with a shot from outside the box five minutes from full-time, but there was enough time for Colchester to grab a winner, with Gavin Massey heading the ball in on the line after Jack Curtis' shot had been deflected. The final pre-season friendly was at home to a Fulham XI on 1 August. Played in front of a crowd of just 642, Fulham earned a 1–0 win through Moussa Dembélé, while goalkeeper Sam Walker played 45 minutes in his comeback from injury.

Having been on trial with Colchester during 2014–15 pre-season, midfielder Darren Ambrose joined the club on a one-year contract on 6 August following his release from Ipswich. The final business prior to the start of the campaign came when youngsters Tyler Brampton and David Segura joined David Wright's Maldon & Tiptree on loan. Wide-player Brampton joined for three months, while Spanish forward Segura signed until January 2016.

League One

August

The U's kicked off their League One campaign at home to Blackpool on 8 August. The match saw the debuts of goalkeeper Elliot Parish, Joe Edwards and Darren Ambrose, a second debut for both Matthew Briggs and Richard Brindley, while Kane Vincent-Young was brought on with eleven minutes remaining to make his professional bow. The visitors took an 18th-minute lead through Mark Cullen, but their lead lasted only four minutes with a volley from Alex Gilbey. In first-half injury time, Cullen struck again to put Blackpool 2–1 ahead going into the break. Debutant Darren Ambrose rescued a point for the U's in the second half when he slotted home a Gavin Massey pass on 56 minutes to level the game at 2–2. Following his debut, Vincent-Young signed a two-year contract extension with the club on 14 August. Ahead of Colchester's second league game of the season, out of favour striker Dan Holman was sent out on a month-long loan to National League side Woking.

With Chris Porter ruled out through injury, Macauley Bonne was handed a start in his place for the U's trip to Peterborough United on 15 August. He scored the game's opening goal on 30 minutes, but the lead lasted just one minute before a Marcus Maddison equaliser levelled the scores. Three minutes later and Peterborough were ahead, with Maddison registering his second and proving to be the difference between the two sides. Kane Vincent-Young had more game time after replacing the injured Matthew Briggs prior to half-time in Colchester's 2–1 defeat. The U's followed up their defeat with a goalless draw against Oldham Athletic at the Community Stadium on 18 August.

Colchester's trip to Fleetwood Town on 22 August saw them concede two goals in either half without reply to continue their winless start to the season. Colchester boosted their ranks on 27 August with the signing of former Crystal Palace and Ipswich Town midfielder Owen Garvan on a short-term contract until January, before reinforcing the midfield further with the loan signing of Charlton Athletic winger Callum Harriott on loan until 2 January 2016.

The U's guaranteed a winless start to the new season on 29 August when they fought back from two goals down to draw 2–2 with Scunthorpe United at the Community Stadium. After Kevin van Veen and Paddy Madden had put the visitors two ahead by the 18th minute, George Moncur scored his first goal of the campaign 15 minutes later to reduce the deficit. Colchester left it late to score their leveller. George Elokobi scored his first goal for the club since his summer return with an 81st-minute header from a Harriott corner.

September

With the transfer window closing on 1 September, Tony Humes made no further signings, but did tie down promising triallist goalkeeper Dillon Barnes to a permanent contract. However, following Barnes' arrival, Chris Lewington was allowed to leave the club by mutual consent on 3 September after making only two appearances for the club. On 10 September, Colchester brought in forward Marvin Sordell on a contract until the end of the season after his release from Burnley earlier in the month. Sordell's signing was followed up by the loan arrival of Preston North End goalkeeper Jamie Jones on 11 September who joined for 93 days. Colchester's first league match for September followed on 12 September, with both new signings starting. The game was tipped to the U's advantage after 16 minutes when Chesterfield had Drew Talbot sent off, but it was Colchester who were first to concede with defender Daniel Jones putting the home side ahead with a free kick on 22 minutes. The U's responded with Gavin Massey's first goal of the season on 29 minutes, where the scores remained until half-time. In the second half, Colchester fell behind once again when Lee Novak scored from close range, before falling further behind on 74 minutes through captain Sam Morsy. The deficit was reduced two minutes later, with George Moncur scoring his second goal of the season. The game was levelled in added time when Chesterfield defender Charlie Raglan put the ball into his own net to draw the game 3–3.

A late penalty save from Jamie Jones ensured Colchester held on to their lead and their first win of the season on 15 September as they edged out 3–2 winners against Sheffield United at Brammall Lane. George Moncur scored his third and fourth goals of the season to give the away side a 2–0 lead at the interval, but the Blades clawed the score back to 2–2 by the midway point of the second half with a Billy Sharp penalty and a Martyn Woolford equaliser. Marvin Sordell scored his first goal for the club in the 82nd minute to hand the lead back to the U's, before Jones' penalty save after George Elokobi had fouled in the penalty area and received a second yellow card for his efforts. The win moved Colchester up out of the relegation places to 19th position in League One.

Another penalty save from Jamie Jones gifted the U's their first home victory of the campaign on 19 September in their 2–1 win over table-topping Gillingham. Gavin Massey scored his second league goal of the campaign after just four minutes of play, with Callum Harriott providing the assist. Colchester were pegged back only three minutes later when Luke Norris scored. Callum Harriott restored his side's lead on 29 minutes with his first goal for the club. Frankie Kent, making his first league start of the season, conceded a penalty in the 33rd minute of play, but Jones, confident from his match-winning penalty save in the last league game, saved Cody McDonald's effort in the centre of the goal. The scores remained the same through the second-half, with Colchester moving up to 12th in the League One standings and inflicting a first league defeat of the season on Gillingham. Just one month after signing a five-month deal with the club, on 25 September, Owen Garvan signed a contract extension until the summer of 2017.

Colchester recorded their third consecutive win at Swindon Town on 26 September with a 2–1 win. George Moncur scored his fifth goal of the season after just three minutes to hand the U's the lead, before a 22nd-minute equaliser from Town's Wes Thomas. Callum Harriott scored his second goal in as many games to put his side ahead once again three minutes before the interval, while a goalless second half pushed Colchester up to 10th position in League One.

Ahead of Colchester's final game of the month on 29 September, Callum Harriott was named in the Football League Team of the Week for matchday nine on the back of his run of good form and goal against Swindon the previous weekend. There was further good news for two more Colchester players, with both Jamie Jones and George Moncur shortlisted for the PFA Fans Player of the Month award for League One for September.

The U's ensured they went the month of September unbeaten in the league with their fourth consecutive win on 29 September with a 2–0 victory over Bradford City. Callum Harriott made it three goals in three games when he opened the scoring after seven minutes, before Marvin Sordell doubled Colchester's advantage after he was picked out by Owen Garvan. The win moved the team up to eighth position in League One.

George Moncur was named as the PFA's Fans Player of the Month for September on 6 October, seeing off competition from fellow finalists Adam Armstrong of Coventry City and Burton Albion's Stuart Beavon. Meanwhile, boss Tony Humes was nominated for the League One Manager of the Month award on 7 October. He faced competition from Bury's David Flitcroft, Burton Albion's Jimmy Floyd Hasselbaink and Southend United's Phil Brown. Despite losing out on the PFA Fans' Player of the Month award, Jamie Jones was nominated for the league's Player of the Month award. He was in the running against Walsall's forward Tom Bradshaw, Rochdale midfielder Peter Vincenti and Bury's Leon Clarke.

October
Colchester played hosts to in-from Bury on 3 October. Despite dominating the play, Bury goalkeeper Rob Lainton kept the U's forward line at bay, making saves from Joe Edwards and George Moncur in the first-half. Leon Clarke made the breakthrough for the away side after 75 minutes which they would hold on to, ending the U's winning run. On 10 October, the U's travelled to Shrewsbury Town. During a first half of limited opportunities, Colchester took the lead on 36 minutes when Shrewsbury defender Mark Ellis put the ball into his own net. Three minutes later, Tom Eastman scored his first goal of the season to give his side a 2–0 half-time lead. At the beginning of a poor second-half display for Colchester, Shrewsbury hit back immediately when substitute Tyrone Barnett scored from close range after just 39-seconds of play. He scored again in the 59th minute to level the scores, before fellow half-time substitute Sullay Kaikai gave them the lead. Kaikai scored his second goal in the 81st minute to inflict a 4–2 defeat on Colchester.

Four first-half goals for home side Wigan Athletic dumped Colchester United back into the bottom-half of the League One table on 17 October. The four goals arrived in 28 minutes, before a late fifth ensured a 5–0 defeat for a woeful Colchester. The club returned to winning ways in their home encounter with Port Vale on 20 October, picking up their first win in three games with a 2–1 victory. George Elokobi's second goal of the campaign set the U's on their way, but Vale's Colin Daniel equalised on the stroke of half-time. Marvin Sordell scored midway through the second half to earn his side three points.

On 24 October, Colchester hosted Walsall at the Community Stadium. The U's found themselves at a two-goal disadvantage within the opening half hour, before they had a goal of their own ruled out for offside. Walsall held onto their lead until four minutes into the second period. George Moncur's sixth goal of the season gave Colchester a lifeline, and three minutes later they equalised with Marvin Sordell's second goal in as many matches. Walsall reinstated their advantage on 57 minutes, but three minutes later United were again level after Owen Garvan scored his first goal for the club. Ten minutes from time, the U's took the lead for the first time in the game when Darren Ambrose scored. They held the lead until the first minute of stoppage time, when Walsall equalised through James O'Connor, resulting in a 4–4 draw. Darren Ambrose's performance in the match earned him a place in the Football League 'Team of the Week' after his goal and two assists.

After struggling to make an impression in the first-team this term, Sammie Szmodics was loaned out to National League club Braintree Town on 30 October in an initial month-long deal.

Colchester travelled to Doncaster Rovers for their final fixture of the month on 31 October. The U's defensive frailties once again showed as they were beaten 2–0 by a goal in either half of the match.

November
On the back of their FA Cup first round win, the U's hosted Coventry City on 14 November, who held former Colchester loanee Jacob Murphy amongst their ranks. The home side took the lead in the 17th minute, with Macauley Bonne scoring his eight goal of the season following his four-goal haul against Wealdstone. Murphy equalised for the visitors on 32 minutes, before putting Coventry ahead five minutes prior to the interval. The game was sealed in City's favour four minutes after the restart when Marc-Antoine Fortuné scored to deliver a 3–1 win to Coventry. Colchester lost their third successive league game on 21 November when they visited Millwall. Having trailed 2–0 at the break, half-time substitute Chris Porter scored his first goal of the season to reduce the deficit, but two further goals for the home side dealt the U's a 4–1 defeat. Another defeat followed on 24 November as the U's fell to a late 3–2 home loss to bottom of the league Crewe Alexandra despite having held a 2–0 lead. Callum Harriott's fourth goal for the club put the U's ahead on 40 minutes, before the lead was doubled by George Moncur's eighth of the season. Crewe pulled one goal back through Ryan Colclough on 61 minutes, before they equalised through Marcus Haber with ten minutes remaining. Loanee Ryan Lowe scored Crewe's winning goal in the second minute of injury time.

On the back of seven defeats in nine League One games and the 3–2 home defeat by Crewe, manager Tony Humes was dismissed by the club on 26 November, with Richard Hall and John McGreal taking temporary charge. The newly installed management team immediately recalled Sammie Szmodics from his Braintree Town loan on 27 November ahead of Colchester's trip to Burton Albion. The pair took charge of first team affairs for Colchester's first ever trip to high-flying Burton Albion on 28 November. Their side had the best-possible start when Callum Harriott opened the scoring for the away team just four-minutes into the match. Burton equalised after 24-minutes through Abdenasser El Khayati, before they took the lead in the 34th minute through Birmingham City loanee Mark Duffy. Burton extended their lead six-minutes into the second-half through Tom Naylor, and Lucas Akins made it 4–1 on 72 minutes. Timmy Thiele completed the rout on 81-minutes to ensure a fifth consecutive league defeat for the club.

December

Chairman Robbie Cowling decided to install a caretaker manager on 2 December in the shape of former U's defender and under-18 coach Wayne Brown, with McGreal assisting while Hall would remain with the club. Following their FA Cup victory, Brown's first league match in charge resulted in a sixth consecutive defeat for the U's on 12 December. On the hour mark, Colchester found themselves 3–0 down at the Community Stadium against Barnsley after goals from Conor Hourihane, Adam Hammill and Ivan Toney. A spirited fight-back saw Colchester reduce the deficit to one goal after two goals in three minutes from George Moncur and Chris Porter, but they couldn't find an equaliser. The result saw the club drop into the relegation zone for the first time since the winless start to the season.

Following Wayne Brown's withdrawal from the running to be the next Colchester United manager, the club hit the bottom of the table on 19 December after a 3–1 defeat away to Rochdale. The U's had taken the lead through Chris Porter after 21-minutes, who scored his second goal in as many games, before ex-Colchester man Ian Henderson equalised from the penalty spot on 30-minutes. Four minutes later, the home side took a 2–1 lead through Donal McDermott and Olly Lancashire sealed the win midway through the second-half.

Colchester named former Reading and West Bromwich Albion assistant manager Kevin Keen as manager on 21 December, with David Wright promoted to assistant after working as both a coach for the club and part-time manager of Maldon & Tiptree. With the news of a new managerial appointment, the injured Sam Walker signed a -year contract extension on 22 December to remain with the club until the summer of 2018.

In his first match in charge, Keen oversaw the Boxing Day Essex derby match against Southend United. After a goalless first-half, two former Colchester players scored against their old club to hand Southend a 2–0 victory. First, John White, a Colchester United youth team product, scored an elusive goal for the visitors on 49-minutes, only his third career goal. Then, on 73 minutes, former loanee Dave Mooney scored after George Elokobi was robbed of the ball. In the final game of 2015, Colchester ensured they equalled a club-record nine consecutive league defeats after another former Colchester loanee, Dominic Samuel, scored the only goal of the game in a close affair with Gillingham at Priestfield on 28 December.

January

January started on a better note for Colchester, earning a 1–1 draw away to Oldham Athletic on 2 January 2016 which moved them off the foot of the table. Rhys Murphy opened the scoring for Oldham after just five minutes, but a late Chris Porter strike against his former club ensured Colchester could not earn an unwanted record of ten consecutive league defeats. Keen's first transfer movements of the January window occurred on 5 January, with Dan Holman allowed to leave the club on a free transfer, joining National League leaders Cheltenham Town. He made his first signing of the transfer window on 7 January, bringing in Norwich City's reserve goalkeeper Jake Kean on an initial 28-day loan deal. Meanwhile, youth-team member Marley Andrews was loaned out to Steve Ball's Maldon & Tiptree for one month. The club tied down the promising Louis Dunne, son of former U's manager and player Joe Dunne, to a three-year development contract on 14 January.

Colchester continued their winless run in the league on 16 January. With the U's having not registered a win in League One in three months, they welcomed Sheffield United to the Community Stadium, and buoyed by their FA Cup victory over Charlton a week prior, Colchester looked to capitalise on this and push on with their faltering league season. The Blades opened the scoring on 20-minutes through Billy Sharp, who had scored in the reverse fixture earlier in the campaign. After the break, the U's equalised when Tom Eastman headed in Marvin Sordell's cross. A point looked to be on the cards for Colchester, but for Chris Basham, who scored a 91st-minute winner for the away side. On 18 January, the U's saw one arrival and one exit. Incoming was former West Ham loanee Elliot Lee, who joined for his second spell with the club until the end of the season. Leaving by mutual consent was Byron Lawrence, who after just one first-team appearance left the club by mutual consent. The following day, Fleetwood Town were the visitors in a 1–1 draw. Alex Gilbey scored the opening goal on 38 minutes, before Eggert Jónsson equalised on the hour mark. The scores remained, and Colchester moved up to 22nd in the League One table, five points from Fleetwood in 20th position and safety.

Kevin Keen made his first permanent signing on 20 January, bringing in former England international defender Nicky Shorey on a deal until the end of the season. While James Bransgrove became the latest player to join Maldon & Tiptree on loan on 22 January, it was reported that the club had turned down an offer for Alex Gilbey from Championship side Bristol City. Keen later described the offer for Gilbey as "a joke".

Colchester were cast further from safety on 23 January after they were beaten 3–0 away to Scunthorpe United. Three goals in the space of eight second-half minutes for the home side left the U's seven points from Shrewsbury in 20th-position.

February
With Norwich loanee Jake Kean returning to his parent club due to "a couple of things" he was unhappy with at Colchester United, goalkeeper Elliot Parish once again returned to first-team action for the U's in their Essex derby away fixture with Southend. Despite losing Alex Gilbey after 36 minutes having been sent off for a challenge on Southend's Ryan Leonard, Colchester put in a solid defensive display against their county neighbour with only ten men. The defence soaked up the pressure until the 82nd minute, when former Colchester player Anthony Wordsworth struck with a 20-yard effort. A short while later, the home side's lead was doubled when Adam Barrett headed in Jack Payne's corner kick. Barrett celebrated by running the length of the pitch to celebrate in front of the Colchester fans. With tensions rising between the two sets of supporters, a lone Southend fan jumped onto the pitch, ran towards the away fans and began throwing punches into the crowd. Other Southend supporters followed by jumping onto the pitch before stewards and some players attempted to defuse the situation, while police said that an investigation into the incident would be launched. Southend added a third goal in the third minute of injury time when on-loan Southampton winger Sam McQueen scored from close range.

Colchester extended their winless run to 16 league games on 13 February with the visit of Swindon to the Community Stadium. Two Nicky Ajose goals, in the 36th and 56th minutes, put the visitors two ahead, before Michael Doughty added a third two minutes later. A half-volley from Joe Edwards saw him score his first goal for the club after 64 minutes to give the U's some hope, but Doughty would strike again in the 72nd minute to inflict a 4–1 defeat on Colchester. In the home encounter with Chesterfield on 16 February, the U's looked to capitalise on an early red card for Chesterfield's Gary Liddle after a foul on Kane Vincent-Young. They took the lead through Macauley Bonne on 69 minutes, but the lead lasted just three minutes when Lee Novak equalised from the penalty spot after Richard Brindley brought Ollie Banks down in the area. The score remained at 1–1 with Colchester remaining bottom of the league and eight points from safety.

On the back of his move from Maldon & Tiptree, Femi Akinwande was given a squad number of 16 on 19 February when he was named in the U's squad to travel to Bury for their fixture on 20 February. The same day, Keen announced that Owen Garvan would take over the club captaincy from Chris Porter "for the foreseeable future" and to "take a little of the responsibility off him [Porter]".

Colchester on 20 February took a 2–0 lead after 17 minutes of their game at Bury. Having been relieved of his captaincy duties, Chris Porter scored after four minutes of play. Gavin Massey then doubled the visitors' lead, but a second yellow card for Tom Eastman after 33 minutes reduced Colchester to ten men. From the resultant free-kick, Ryan Lowe scored against Colchester having scored against the U's for Crewe while on loan earlier in the season. Colchester held on to their 2–1 lead through half-time, but conceded twice in the space of one minute to two Andrew Tutte efforts. Craig Jones added a fourth for Bury after 56 minutes, before Tutte sealed his hat-trick in the 62nd minute to inflict a 5–2 defeat on Colchester.

With Tom Eastman suspended following his red card at Bury, reinforcements arrived from West Ham on 26 February, with Leo Chambers joining for an initial month-long loan, while Tottenham winger Nathan Oduwa also signed for a month. Chambers started Colchester's home match with Shrewsbury on 27 February, while Oduwa was introduced as an 82nd-minute substitute for Gavin Massey as the sides drew 0–0.

March
On 1 March, it was announced that Tony Humes would be making a return to the club as of 7 March in a director of football role, with Tony Ashby taking up the position of football operations manager. After 19 League One games without a victory, Colchester finally broke their duck on 1 March during their away trip to Bradford City. Colchester were the first to concede, with play-off chasing Bradford striking first in the 17th minute through Wes Thomas. The home side's lead lasted just six minutes when Darren Ambrose's volleyed shot earned the U's an equaliser. He then struck again in the 57th minute to give Colchester a long-awaited victory, but despite the win, the club remained ten points from safety.

Colchester fell back into familiar ways with a 2–0 away defeat at Port Vale on 5 March. A goal in either half ensured the U's remained bottom of the table. Keen was moments away from picking up a second league win on 12 March at home to Wigan Athletic but for a last minute equaliser from Will Grigg. Handing a professional debut to Femi Akinwande, Keen's Colchester side fell behind to Wigan on 36-minutes when Yanic Wildschut scored, but four minutes later, Alex Gilbey equalised with a long-range strike. The U's went into half-time 2–1 down, conceding one minute before the interval to a Ryan Colclough goal who had already scored for Crewe against Colchester earlier in the season. Elliot Lee scored his first goal in his second spell with the club to level the score at 2–2 on 50-minutes, and ten minutes later George Moncur scored for the first time in two-months from the penalty spot after being fouled by Reece Wabara. Louis Dunne replaced Lee to make his professional debut after 77-minutes before Grigg scored the late equaliser.

Another precious win was cruelly stolen from Colchester by Walsall on 19 March at the Bescot Stadium when two goals in the final minutes of the game for the home side consigned the U's to a 2–1 defeat. Alex Gilbey headed in Owen Garvan's cross in first-half injury time to five the visitors a lead which they would hold onto until the 89th-minute. Tom Bradshaw equalised before defender Matt Preston's shot in the fourth minute of added time found the back of the net.

Several loan transfer movements were made ahead of the Easter weekend. On 23 March, youngsters Tyler Brampton and Joe Tennent joined Isthmian League Premier Division side Grays Athletic. Brampton's second loan of the season would see him remain with Grays until the end of the campaign, while Tennent made his first move away from Colchester on work experience. Meanwhile, Dion Sembie-Ferris was also allowed to leave the club on a temporary basis having not made an appearance in the first-team under Kevin Keen. He joined National League South outfit Margate until the end of the season on 24 March.

Colchester were lifted from the foot of the table for the first time in nine games on 25 March after beating Doncaster Rovers 4–1 at the Community Stadium. Doncaster took the lead after-21 minutes through Gary McSheffrey after Frankie Kent had been introduced to replace the injured Leo Chambers. A stirring second-half performance saw Colchester first equalise when Chris Porter netted in the 62nd minute and then take the lead through Elliot Lee on 71-minutes. One minute later, Alex Gilbey scored his third goal in three games to put the U's 3–1 up and there was still time for substitute Richard Brindley to score his first ever league goal three minutes from time. The U's then picked up their first back-to-back wins since September on 29 March as they overcame Coventry by a single goal at the Ricoh Arena. Gavin Massey scored the decisive goal in the 1–0 win. The win came on the back of news of West Ham loanee Leo Chambers extending his loan deal until the end of the season.

Colchester's result against Coventry earned the club the League Managers Association 'Performance of the Week' award, as voted by the panel consisting of LMA chairman Howard Wilkinson, Alex Ferguson, Joe Royle, Dave Bassett and Barry Fry. Keen was also nominated for the League One 'Manager of the Month' award for March.

April
Colchester's first match in April was a home game with play-off hopefuls Millwall. In a match where the U's had the better of the chances, the game ended 0–0 meaning Colchester remained seven points adrift of safety with six games remaining. On 9 April, a Chris Porter goal proved to be the difference between Colchester and Blackpool as the U's won their third match in four games at Bloomfield Road. Then Colchester's survival hopes were dealt a blow when, despite having the better of the game they were defeated 4–1 by Peterborough United on 16 April to leave them nine-points adrift. Jon Taylor's goal put the visitors in the lead after just two-minutes before George Moncur had a penalty saved by Peterborough goalkeeper Ben Alnwick. In the second-half, two goals in two minutes put Peterborough 3–0 up, before Moncur pulled a goal back. The scoring was complete in the fourth minute of injury time when Marcus Maddison scored his third goal of the season against the U's.

A late Crewe equaliser denied the U's the opportunity to close the gap on the teams above them in the table on 19 April. Having led 1–0 since the 65th-minute when George Moncur converted a penalty, Crewe scored through a Callum Saunders header in the first minute of second-half stoppage time. Their fate was finally sealed on 23 April when they were beaten 3–0 at home to promotion hopefuls Burton, spelling a return to the fourth tier of English football for the first time in 18-years. Kevin Keen dropped Alex Gilbey and George Moncur from the starting eleven, preferring Louis Dunne in midfield who made his first senior start. The match got off to a bad start for the U's when Joe Edwards was sent off for a challenge on Matt Palmer in only the 17th-minute, before falling behind to the first of three Lucas Akins goals on the stroke of half-time. It took him just four minutes after the restart to score his second, and the game was effectively over on the hour mark when he scored his third. Edwards' red card was later rescinded on 26 April.

Following Colchester's relegation, Keen left the club by mutual consent on 26 April. David Wright was placed in temporary charge for Colchester's final two games of the season. Meanwhile, the club confirmed contract extensions for Alex Wynter, who signed for a further two-years, and young goalkeeper James Bransgrove, who signed until 2019.

Wright's newly acquired side battled back from 2–1 down to secure a point against Barnsley on 30 April with an equaliser deep in added time. George Moncur's 14th goal of the season gave Colchester the lead in the 42nd minute and the side went into the break in a winning position. After the interval, Barnsley equalised through Ashley Fletcher on 57-minutes, and then Fletcher gave his side the lead with ten minutes remaining. Tom Lapslie scored his first league goal of the season in the eighth minute of stoppage time to earn the U's a draw.

May
Chairman Robbie Cowling was quick to announce Keen's successor. On 4 May, he revealed John McGreal would be taking up the role of manager with Steve Ball his assistant ahead of Colchester's final game of the season. With McGreal's role set to commence following Colchester's game with Rochdale on 8 May, Ball was named as the club's fifth caretaker manager of the season after David Wright was made unavailable for "personal reasons".

Ahead of the final game of the campaign, three development squad players signed new one-year deals with the club, with Charley Edge, Michael O'Donoghue and Chris Regis all agreeing new contracts.

Colchester ended the campaign in defeat against Rochdale on 8 May. Caretaker manager Steve Ball had named Dillon Barnes in the first-team as goalkeeper, which would have been his professional debut following Elliot Parish's injury the previous weekend. However, Barnes was caught up in traffic, and James Bransgrove stepped in to instead make his professional bow. The U's were behind after 18-minutes when Nathaniel Mendez-Laing scored. Joe Edwards levelled the scores eight-minutes after the interval but had to go off injured after 64-minutes. His replacement, Cameron James, became the second player of the day to make his professional debut. Five minutes later, Rochdale scored the winner from Calvin Andrew to end Colchester's miserable season in yet another defeat.

League Cup
Colchester hosted Championship opposition in the first round of the League Cup, with Reading coming to the Community Stadium for the first time. The match saw Sam Walker make his first appearance of the season, but was replaced by Elliot Parish just before the hour mark following an injury. The match went to extra time, with Reading nicking a late goal through Chris Gunter to send the U's out of the competition in the first round for the fifth successive season.

Football League Trophy
The Football League Trophy first round handed Colchester a trip to League Two Northampton Town on 1 September. Dominic Calvert-Lewin opened the scoring for the hosts after 9 minutes, but Macauley Bonne scored his second of the season to level the scores on 32 minutes. In the second half, Ryan Watson once again gave Northampton the lead, before Bonne struck again to score his first brace for Colchester in the 82nd minute. Three minutes later however, Northampton were back in front through Marc Richards. The score remained at 3–2 until full-time to ensure Colchester's second exit of the season from a cup competition at the first round stage.

FA Cup
Colchester were pitted away to National League South side Wealdstone in the first round draw of the FA Cup made on 26 October. The two sides have twice previously met in the competition, firstly in 1949 when the U's were defeated 1–0 away, and more recently in 1983 when they won 4–0 at Layer Road. Colchester's game on 7 November proved as fruitful as their previous encounter, recording a 6–2 victory at the Freebets.co.uk stadium. Macauley Bonne opened the scoring following a goalless first 26 minutes, but the U's were pegged back by their sixth tier opponents five minutes later when Jefferson Louis converted a penalty after Joe Edwards had fouled in the area. Colchester fell behind on 38 minutes when Bradley Hudson-Odoi scored from close range to make it 2–1 to the home side, but Bonne levelled the score with his second on 44 minutes, heading in Callum Harriott's cross. Bonne sealed his hat-trick two-minutes after half-time to reinstate Colchester's lead, before scoring his fourth goal on 68 minutes. George Moncur scored Colchester's fifth goal in the 82nd minute, before Marvin Sordell rounded off the match with a 90th-minute effort. Bonne was brought off in the final minute of stoppage time, making way for debutant midfielder Jack Curtis to experience his first brief taste of professional football. Bonne's goal haul was the first time a Colchester United player had scored a hat-trick since Jamie Cureton against Southend United on 6 April 2007, and equalled Colchester's record for the most goals in a competitive game by a single player. He joined the likes of Arthur Pritchard, Arthur Turner, Vic Keeble, Neil Langman, Bobby Hunt, Martyn King, Bobby Svarc, Roy McDonough, and Chris Iwelumo, the last of whom scored the most recent quadruple against Hull City at Layer Road on 28 November 2006.

In the second round draw on the 9 November, the U's were handed a home tie against National League side Altrincham. Caretaker manager Wayne Brown led his side to victory in his first match in charge thanks to a Callum Harriott goal in the fourth minute of stoppage time to beat the National League outfit 3–2. Altincham had opened the scoring after just three minutes at the Community Stadium through Jake Moult, whose lobbed 25-yard shot caught goalkeeper Jamie Jones off his line. The U's equalised after 14-minutes, when Harriott scored his third goal in as many games with an assist from Marvin Sordell. The score remained level through to half-time, but Colchester fell behind just 18-seconds after the restart when Michael Rankine beat George Elokobi and placed his shot past Jones. Colchester again had to come from behind to equalise in the 53rd minute as Tom Lapslie scored his first goal of the season following a chipped cross from Sordell. With the prospect of a replay trip to Altrincham looming, Harriott struck to score his second of the game and see the U's through to the third round for the second successive season.

The draw for the third round of the FA Cup, which took place on 7 December saw the U's handed a home tie against struggling Championship opposition in the shape of Charlton Athletic. Kevin Keen managed the side to their first win under his stewardship against their second tier opposition on 9 January 2016. George Moncur's tenth goal of the campaign handed the U's a 1–0 lead after 28-minutes, before assist-provider Marvin Sordell doubled Colchester's advantage four minutes before the interval, with Moncur returning the favour. Charlton rallied late on to grab a consolation goal in the second minute of added time, but Colchester held on to find themselves in the draw for the fourth round for the first time in ten years.

A home match against Premier League team Tottenham Hotspur was set after the club beat Leicester City  2–0 at King Power Stadium on 20 January 2016. The game is scheduled to be played between 29 January and 1 February. On 20 January, Tottenham beat Leicester 2–0 in their replay match at the King Power Stadium to set up a fourth round tie with the U's. It would be the first time the two sides would meet in a competitive fixture. A sickening clash of heads between Colchester defenders Tom Eastman and Alex Wynter in the opening two minutes of the game immediately put the home side on the back foot in the game on 30 January. Wynter was taken to hospital after suffering concussion and a seizure on the pitch and was replaced by Frankie Kent after several minutes of treatment on the field. After being bandaged up, Eastman continued to play, but was withdrawn and replaced by Matthew Briggs after 21-minutes of the match. After dominating much of the play, Spurs opened the scoring through Nacer Chadli's fine curling 20-yard effort midway through the first-half, and the score remained the same until the 64th-minute when Eric Dier scored with a deflected shot. Chadli scored his second of the match after 78-minutes, but just two minutes later, Colchester scored a consolation goal after Gavin Massey's driven shot was turned into his own net by Ben Davies. Another two-minutes passed before Tottenham scored their fourth goal to seal the game with Tom Carroll firing the ball home.

Players

First-team squad

Under-21s

Match details

Preseason friendlies

League One

Results round by round

League table

Matches
The fixtures for the 2015–16 season were announced on 17 June 2014 at 9am.

League Cup
The League Cup first round draw was made on 16 June 2015. Colchester United were drawn at home against Championship side Reading.

FA Cup
The FA Cup first round draw was made on 26 October 2015, with Colchester being drawn away to National League South side Wealdstone. The second round draw, made on 9 November, saw the U's handed a home tie against Altrincham of the National League. In the third round draw made on 7 December, Colchester were drawn at home to Championship side Charlton Athletic. After beating Charlton, Colchester were given a home tie against Premier League opposition in the fourth round draw on 11 January 2016, with either Leicester City or Tottenham Hotspur visiting the Community Stadium.

Football League Trophy
On 8 August 2015, live on Soccer AM the draw for the first round of the Football League Trophy was drawn by Toni Duggan and Alex Scott. The U's would travel to Northampton Town on 1/2 September.

Squad statistics

Appearances and goals

|-
!colspan="14"|Players who appeared for Colchester who left during the season

|}

Goalscorers

Disciplinary record

Player debuts
Players making their first-team Colchester United debut in a fully competitive match.

Transfers and contracts

In

Out

Loans in

Loans out

Contracts
New contracts and contract extensions.

Honours and awards

End-of-season awards

See also
List of Colchester United F.C. seasons

References

2015-16
2015–16 Football League One by team